Stuart McLaren (born 28 August 1975) is a Scottish/Australian football player and coach, who is currently employed at Scottish club Celtic as U18 manager.

Biography
Queensland Roar coach Miron Bleiberg signed McLaren on a short-term contract in early November 2005. He was signed due to Josh McCloughlan's injury, playing as a defender as he did when he was a former player-coach with the Brisbane Strikers in the NSL. He was then signed as a permanent player and regularly played in the starting eleven, occasionally captaining the Queensland Roar.

McLaren left Australia in early 2011 returning to the United Kingdom to be nearer his place of birth with his family. In June 2011, he was appointed as head coach at Loughborough University. McLaren was appointed manager of Stirling Albion in November 2014, but the Binos were relegated from Scottish League One at the end of the 2014–15 season. He left Stirling Albion by mutual consent in September 2016, following a 4–0 defeat by Elgin City.

In October 2018, McLaren was appointed by the Scottish Football Association to be a national youth team coach, with responsibility for the Scotland U16 team.

McLaren was appointed interim manager of the Scotland women's national football team in January 2021. He remained in the role until the appointment of permanent manager Pedro Martinez Losa, and left the SFA at the end of 2021.

In January 2022, Celtic announced McLaren had joined them as their under-18s manager.

Managerial statistics

Scottish senior clubs statistics only.

Honours 
Brisbane Strikers
National Soccer League: Runners-up 2003–04
QSL Premiers: 2009

Loughborough University
BUCS Championship: 2013
BUCS Premier North Division: 2012, 2013

Scotland U16
Victory Shield: 2019–20 (shared)

References

External links
 Oz Football profile
 Glory replacements in the mix

1975 births
Living people
Footballers from Glasgow
Scottish footballers
Scottish football managers
Scottish expatriate football managers
Australian soccer players
Australian soccer coaches
Australian expatriate soccer coaches
A-League Men players
National Soccer League (Australia) players
Brisbane Strikers FC players
Perth Glory FC players
Brisbane Roar FC players
Stirling Albion F.C. players
Wollongong Wolves FC players
Scottish Football League players
Stirling Albion F.C. managers
Scottish Professional Football League managers
Association football central defenders
Association football midfielders
Scottish emigrants to Australia
Brisbane Strikers coaches
Scotland women's national football team managers